Rakowo may refer to the following places:
Rakowo, Kuyavian-Pomeranian Voivodeship (north-central Poland)
Rakowo, Płock County in Masovian Voivodeship (east-central Poland)
Rakowo, Podlaskie Voivodeship (north-east Poland)
Rakowo, Płońsk County in Masovian Voivodeship (east-central Poland)
Rakowo, Gniezno County in Greater Poland Voivodeship (west-central Poland)
Rakowo, Konin County in Greater Poland Voivodeship (west-central Poland)
Rakowo, Wągrowiec County in Greater Poland Voivodeship (west-central Poland)
Rakowo, Lubusz Voivodeship (west Poland)
Rakowo, Pomeranian Voivodeship (north Poland)
Rakowo, Warmian-Masurian Voivodeship (north Poland)
Rakowo, Choszczno County in West Pomeranian Voivodeship (north-west Poland)
Rakowo, Szczecinek County in West Pomeranian Voivodeship (north-west Poland)